Huang Ming (born October 1957) is a Chinese politician currently serving as Minister of Emergency Management and previously the director of the 610 Office an extrajudicial organisation set up by General Secretary Jiang Zemin for the purposes of disruption and suppression of the Falun Gong spiritual movement.

Biography
Huang was born in Xinghua, Jiangsu Province in October 1957.

Huang became involved in politics in 1975. From August 1975 to December 1978, Huang worked in Xinghua County.

In December 1978, after Resumption of University Entrance Examination, Huang was accepted to Jiangsu Police Academy and graduated in 1982, and he was graduated from Nanjing Normal University in 1995.

From 1982 to 2000, Huang worked in Jiangsu Public Security Office. In 2000 he was promoted to become the Deputy Director of Jiangsu Public Security Office, a position he held until 2003. From April 2003 to November 2008, Huang was promoted to become the Director of Jiangsu Public Security Office. In August 2009, he was appointed the Deputy Minister of Public Security.

In March 2018, he was appointed party chief and vice minister of Emergency.

References 

1957 births
Chinese police officers
Politicians from Taizhou, Jiangsu
Living people
People's Republic of China politicians from Jiangsu
Chinese Communist Party politicians from Jiangsu
Members of the 19th Central Committee of the Chinese Communist Party